Dominic Saidu (born 19 March 1950) is a Liberian sprinter. He competed in the men's 200 metres at the 1972 Summer Olympics.

References

1950 births
Living people
Athletes (track and field) at the 1972 Summer Olympics
Liberian male sprinters
Olympic athletes of Liberia
Place of birth missing (living people)